Boustead may refer to the following:

Boustead & Co, a London merchant banking business
Boustead Singapore, a Singapore engineering company
Boustead Group, a Malaysian company
Boustead Hill, an English village
Boustead Cup, an annual English rowing race

People with the surname
Edward Boustead (1800–1888), an English businessman
Hugh Boustead, a British officer, pentathlete, and diplomat
Kerry Boustead, an Australian rugby league footballer